Citibank India is a foreign bank in India with a full service onshore platform. Its Indian headquarters is at Bandra Kurla Complex, Mumbai, Maharashtra. It is a subsidiary of Citigroup, a multinational financial services corporation headquartered in New York City, United States. Citibank India's services are investment banking, advisory and transaction services, capital markets, risk management, retail banking, and Cards. Although headquartered in Mumbai, the bank has most of its workforce based out of Chennai followed by Mumbai and Gurugram.

On 15 April 2021, after 119 years in India, Citibank said that it will exit consumer banking businesses in 13 markets including India as part of a restructuring plan.

History
Established in 1902 in Calcutta (Kolkata), Citi India has a long history. Currently, Citigroup, the owner of Citi India, is one of the largest foreign direct investors in financial services in the country. Citi introduced early innovations to India such as the ATM, credit card, 24-hour phone banking, internet banking, and instant SMS alerts.

Citi India is backed by a network spanning 98 markets across the world. The bank serves close to 25 lakh (2.5 million) customers ranging from corporate houses, multinationals operating in India, SMEs, self-employed entrepreneurs, households, and individuals.

Scandal
In 1992, Citibank was one of the foreign banks linked to the 1992 Indian stock market scam.

Exit 
In April 2021, Citi announced that it will exit the consumer banking operations in India, Australia, Bahrain, China, Indonesia, Korea, Malaysia, Philippines, Poland, Russia, Taiwan, Thailand and Vietnam. The bank said that its institutional client group will continue to serve customers in these 13 countries.

The bank said that it does not see enough scale in the consumer business in the 13 markets and believes its “capital, investment dollars and other resources are better deployed against higher returning opportunities in wealth management and our institutional businesses in Asia.”

In 2022, it was announced that Citibank India's customer business would be acquired by Axis Bank for ₹12,325 crore ($1.6 billion). The deal is expected to be completed by Q4 FY 2023.

Leadership 
Ashu Khullar was named chief executive officer in 2019. Khullar joined Citi in 1988 and worked for Citibank in Europe, Africa, and London. Before taking office, he was the head of capital markets for the Asia-pacific region.

Former CEO, Pramit Jhaveri, became vice-chairman of Citi-group's banking, capital markets and advisory business for Asia Pacific in 2019. He served as CEO for nine years before stepping down.

Products and services
Citi India offers consumers and institutions a broad range of financial products and services, including consumer banking and credit; corporate and investment banking; institutional equity research and sales; foreign exchange; credit cards, commercial banking; and treasury and trade solutions. Citi India's balance sheet is considered among the best performing in the Indian banking industry, with a net NPA level of 0.55% as of 31 March 2018.

Digital Wallet Support
Citibank India only supports Samsung Pay, for their credit cards, not debit cards. Apple Pay, Google Pay or their own proprietary apps are not supported.

References

External links
 Official website

Citigroup
Banks of India
Banks based in Mumbai
Indian subsidiaries of foreign companies
Banks established in 1902
Indian companies established in 1902